HD 116243 is a single star in the southern constellation of Centaurus. It has the Bayer designation m Centauri, while HD 116243 is the identifier from the Henry Draper catalogue. This star has a yellow hue and is faintly visible to the naked eye with an apparent visual magnitude of +4.52. It is located at a distance of approximately 244 light years from the Sun based on parallax, and it has an absolute magnitude of 0.01. It is drifting further away with a radial velocity of +13.3 km/s.

This object is an aging bright giant star with a stellar classification of G6IIb With the supply of hydrogen at its core exhausted, it has expanded to 12 times the radius of the Sun. The star is radiating 89 times the luminosity of the Sun from its enlarged photosphere at an effective temperature of 5,197 K.

References

G-type bright giants
Centauri, m
Centaurus (constellation)
Durchmusterung objects
116243
065387
5041